Big Creative Academy is a free school sixth form located in the Walthamstow area of the London Borough of Waltham Forest, England.

Big Creative Academy was established in 2014 and specialises in the creative industries. The academy is part of Big Creative Education which also provides creative-focused apprenticeships and training.

Big Creative Academy offers vocational sixth form courses in the creative industries at levels 1 to 3. Areas of study include Creative Media Production, Dance, Drama, Events Management, Fashion Design, Marketing, Music Practice and Music Production.

References

External links
Big Creative Academy official website

Free schools in London
Education in the London Borough of Waltham Forest
Walthamstow
Educational institutions established in 2014
2014 establishments in England